Grimke is a crater on Venus at latitude 17.2, longitude 215.3. It is 34.8 km in diameter and is named after Sarah Grimké.

Impact craters on Venus